The 1983 Penrith and The Border by-election was a parliamentary by-election held  on 28 July 1983 for the British House of Commons constituency of Penrith and The Border in Cumbria.

Held seven weeks after the election in which the Conservatives won a second term by a landslide, it was the very first by-election of the 1983–1987 parliament.

Vacancy 
The seat had become vacant when the constituency's Conservative Member of Parliament (MP), William Whitelaw had been elevated to the peerage as Viscount Whitelaw.  Whitelaw had held the seat since the 1955 general election, and had been Deputy Leader of the Conservative Party since 1974, and Deputy Prime Minister since 1979, serving as Home Secretary from 1979 until his ennoblement and appointment as Leader of the House of Lords.

Result 
The result of the contest was a narrow victory for the Conservative candidate, David Maclean, who won with a majority of 552 over the SDP-Liberal Alliance candidate Michael Young.

Votes

References

See also

 Penrith and the Border (UK Parliament constituency)
 Penrith
 List of United Kingdom by-elections

Penrith and The Border by-election
Penrith and The Border by-election
Penrith and The Border by-election
By-elections to the Parliament of the United Kingdom in Cumbria constituencies
Politics of Allerdale
1980s in Cumbria